Guabal is a river village in the Huancabamba River valley, located on a western tributary of this river in northwestern Peru. It lies roughly 90 kilometres southwest of Jaén. The Limon Dam is under construction to the south.

References

Populated places in the Cajamarca Region